American Orthodox Saints

 Alexander Hotovitzky, hieromartyr, Missionary of America
 Alexis of Wilkes-Barre, Missionary, leader of ex-Uniates into Orthodoxy
 Bogoljub Gakovich, hieromartyr
 Bazyli Martysz, hieromartyr, Polish protopresbyter who served parishes in Alaska, Canada, and Pennsylvania 
 Herman of Alaska, first missionary to Alaska
 Innocent of Alaska, missionary bishop to Alaska
 Jacob Netsvetov, a native of the Aleutian Islands who became a priest
 John Kochurov, first hieromartyr in 1917
 John Maximovitch, ROCOR bishop of Shanghai and San Francisco, wonderworker
 Juvenaly of Alaska, Protomartyr of America
 Mardarije Uskokovich, a Serbian bishop of North America; founder of St. Sava's Monastery in Libertyville, Illinois, also known as Mardarije (Uskokovich) of Jordanville
 Matej Stijačić, hieromartyr
 Nikolaj Velimirović, influential theological writer and a highly gifted orator, rector of St. Tikhon's Seminary
 Peter the Aleut, protomartyr of America
 Raphael of Brooklyn, founder of the Antiochian Orthodox Mission in America
 Sebastian Dabovich, first American-born Orthodox priest of Jackson, California
 Seraphim (Samoylovich) of Uglich, missionary in Alaska and hieromartyr under the Soviets
 Teofan Beatović, hieromartyr
 Tikhon of Moscow, was bishop of the Aleutians and Alaska, missionary, then Patriarch of Moscow
 Varnava Nastić, the New Confessor, born in Gary, Indiana
 Brendan the Navigator, early Irish monastic saint
 Anatoly (Kamensky), teach of St. Platon's Orthodox Theological Seminary

See also
List of Eastern Orthodox saint titles
List of Russian saints

Sources 
Derived with permission from List of American saints at OrthodoxWiki.

 American
American
Saints, American